Arundhati is an Indian actress who predominantly appears in South Indian films, primarily Tamil and Kannada. Arundhati made her debut in a Tamil movie and this includes Veluthu Kattu (2013) which was produced by S.A. Chandrasekhar who also gave her the screen name Arundhati. After this, she played pivotal roles in numerous Tamil films including Bodinayakkanur Ganesan (2011), Sundaattam (2014,  Agraja (2014), Netru Indru (2014), Naaigal Jaakirathai (2014), Thottal Thodarum (2015), Arthanari (2016), Kaala (2018).

In 2014 Arundhati made a guest appearance in the Kannada film Agraja with Darshan and also acted opposite Thaman Kumar in the Tamil romantic thriller movie Thottal Thodarum (2015) after her noted performance in the comedy-thriller Naaigal Jaakirathai (2014) opposite Sibi Sathyaraj. In 2018 she was part of Kaala.

Early life
Arundhati was born in  Bengaluru, Karnataka, India, to Venkatswamy and Geetha. She has a younger brother named Yogesh. She finished her PUC from Bapu composite PU College in Bangalore and then started a training course as an air hostess in Bangalore.

Career
Director and producer S. A. Chandrashekar spotted and approached Arundhati, then still a student, in a temple and offered her a pivotal role in the film Veluthu Kattu. The film's box office returns were average, though critics have praised her performance.

S. A. Chandrashekar gave her the screen name Arundhati, which was then adopted by the Tamil film industry. She was very choosy about her role and this resulted in her turning down some offers until acting in Bodinayakarun Ganesan (2011) and Sundattam (2013) opposite Ifran. In 2014 she appeared in a challenging role in Netru Indru  as a police officer who is disguised as a prostitute. Though this movie did not make big at the box office, she was praised for her role in this film.

She then appeared in the romantic thriller Thottal Thodarum (2015) opposite Thaman Kumar after playing a pivotal role in the comedy-thriller movie Naaigal Jaakirathai (2014) opposite Sibi Sathyaraj. This movie turned out to be a box office hit and she received positive reviews from the critics. In 2016, she played the female lead in the action flick Arthanari which was a box-office disaster. But she was noted for her performance in 2018 Kaala which had an ensemble cast. She has been signed to play the lead in Mugam which is currently under production.

Filmography
All films are in Tamil, unless otherwise noted.

Television
2017- Gramathil Oru Naal (Sun TV)

References

 https://www.deccanchronicle.com/entertainment/kollywood/150817/arundhati-essays-a-bold-role-in-kaala.html
 https://www.thehindu.com/features/cinema/Air-hostess-to-actress-Arundhati/article14492707.ece
 https://indianexpress.com/article/entertainment/regional/arundhati-plays-a-ghost-in-allari-nareshs-next-2915387/

External links
 

Actresses in Kannada cinema
Indian film actresses
Actresses in Tamil cinema
Living people
Actresses from Bangalore
21st-century Indian actresses
Year of birth missing (living people)